Wittstrauch is a lower summit of the Frauenberg, Hesse, Germany. Many of its trees were damaged by Kyrill in early 2007 as you can see in the photo.

References

Mountains of Hesse